Rajasthani cuisine is the cuisine of the rugged Rajasthan region in North West India. It was influenced by both the warlike lifestyles of its inhabitants and the availability of ingredients in an arid region. Food that could last for several days and could be eaten without heating was preferred. Scarcity of water and fresh green vegetables have all had their effect on the cooking. It is also known for its snacks like Bikaneri bhujia, Mirchi bada and Pyaaj kachori. Other famous dishes include Dal Baati, malaidar special lassi (lassi) and Lashun ki chutney (hot garlic paste), Mawa lassi from Jodhpur, Alwar ka mawa, Malpauas from Pushkar and rasgulla from Bikaner, "paniya"and "gheriya" from Mewar. Originating for the Marwar region of the state is the concept Marwari Bhojnalaya, or vegetarian  restaurants, today found in many parts of India, which offer vegetarian food of the Marwari people. The history also has its effect on the diet as the Rajputs preferred majorly a non-vegetarian diet while the Brahmin, Jains, and others preferred a vegetarian diet. So, the state has a myriad of both types of delicacies.

According to a 2014 survey released by the registrar general of India, Rajasthan has 74.9% vegetarians, which makes it the most vegetarian state in India.

Rajput cuisine
Rajasthani cuisine is also influenced by the Rajputs, who are predominantly non-vegetarians. Their diet consisted of game meat and  dishes like Laal maas (meat in red gravy), Safed maas (meat in white gravy) and Jungli maas (game meat cooked with basic ingredients).

Sweet dishes
Sweet dishes are never referred to as 'dessert' in Rajasthan, because unlike desserts which are served after the meal, Rajasthani sweets are served before, during and after the meal.
Balushahi
Besan Chakki
Churma
DilKhushaal
Sutar Feni
Ghevar
Gujia
Seero (Hindi: Halwa)
Imarti
Jhajariya
Kadka
Milk-Cake (Alwar ka Mawa)
Makkhan-bada
Palang Torh
Mawa Kachori
Jalebi
Ras malai
Gulab halwa(Pali)
Tillpatti (Beawar)
Diljani (Udaipur)
Laapsi

Typical Rajasthani dishes

Panchkuta/Ker Sangri
Kabuli—Veg layered Pulao
Dal Baati Churma
Pittod ki sabzi
Besan Childa Sabzi
Ker Dak (Raisins) sabzi
Gatte matar khichadi
Gatte ki sabzi (Gravy/Dry)
Lacha Pakori
Gulab Jamun ki Sabzi
Govind Gatte
Bajra Roti, Kadi
Mogar ki sabzi
Aloo matar ro saag
Beans ro saag
Besan Gatte/patod ro saag
besan purala
Childa
dahi mein aloo
Dal Chawal Kutt
danamethi, papad ro saag
Gajar ro saag
Govind Gatte or Shahi Gatte
Guwar fali ro saag
Haldi ro saag
Jaipuri
Kadahai
Bajra ri raab
Kakdi & Guwar fali ro saag
Karela ro saag
Ker-saangri ro saag
Kicha ro saag
Kikoda ro saag
Lauki ra Koftey
Makki ri ghaat
Makki ri raab
Makkai ro saag
Badi
 Masala Gatta
Matar ro saag
Meethi danamethi
Moranga ro saag
Motha ro saag
Papad, Badi ro saag
Papad ro saag
Pyaaz Paneer
Raabdi
Rabori ro saag
Sev Tamatar
Dal Tadka
Bajra ki roti
Gutte ki Khichadi
Bharma Tinda
Aam ki kadhi
Jaipuri mewa Pulao
Kalmi vada
Dal Banjari
Bajra ka Khichda
Besan ki Sabzi
Achar of Mutton
 Dal Baati Churma

Breads
Ghehu roti
Bazare ki roti
Makai roti

Beverages
Jaljeera
Butter Milk
Bajra Raab
Masala Chaach
Makhaniya Lassi
Bael Juice
Shikanji
Gulab Sarbat

Snacks
Kadke sev
Lahsun sev/namkeen
Kadhi kachori
Methi mathhri
Bikaneri bhujiya

References

External links

Rajasthani Rasoi

 
Indian cuisine by state or union territory